The following sortable table comprises the 38 ultra-prominent summits of the nation of Greenland (Kalaallit Nunaat).  Each of these peaks has at least  of topographic prominence.

The summit of a mountain or hill may be measured in three principal ways:
The topographic elevation of a summit measures the height of the summit above a geodetic sea level.
The topographic prominence of a summit is a measure of how high the summit rises above its surroundings.
The topographic isolation (or radius of dominance) of a summit measures how far the summit lies from its nearest point of equal elevation.



Ultra-prominent summits

Gunnbjørn Fjeld exceeds  of topographic prominence.  Six peaks of Greenland exceed , and the following 38 peaks are ultra-prominent summits with at least  of topographic prominence.

Gallery

See also

List of mountain peaks of North America
List of mountain peaks of Greenland

List of mountain peaks of Canada
List of mountain peaks of the Rocky Mountains
List of mountain peaks of the United States
List of mountain peaks of México
List of mountain peaks of Central America
List of mountain peaks of the Caribbean
Greenland
Geography of Greenland
Geology of Greenland
:Category:Mountains of Greenland
commons:Category:Mountains of Greenland
Physical geography
Topography
Topographic elevation
Topographic prominence
Topographic isolation

Other mountains
Angiartarfik
Nalumasortoq
Tiningnertok (Apostelen Tommelfinger)
Ulamertorsuaq

Notes

References

External links

Kalaallit Nunaat
Bivouac.com
Peakbagger.com
Peaklist.org
Peakware.com
Summitpost.org

 
Ultras
Geography of Greenland
Greenland, List Of The Ultra-Prominent Summits Of